Mr. Hex is a 1946 film directed by William Beaudine and starring the comedy team of The Bowery Boys.  It is the fifth film in the series.

Plot
The boys are trying to raise money for their friend Gloria.  She has to give up her aspiring singing career in order to stay home and take care of her sick mother.  Slip comes up with the idea to hypnotize Sach into thinking he is an unbeatable fighter so that they can enter him into a contest to win $2,500.  Meanwhile, Gabe brokers a deal with a crooked nightclub owner to give Gloria the big break she has been waiting for.  The nightclub owner then hires a ringer to fight Sach as well as his own hypnotist to counter Slip's control over Sach in order to collect a fortune from everyone who has bet on Sach.

The resulting match has Sach going back and forth from being hypnotized to being aware of reality.  In the end Gabe gets shot trying to expose the crooked nightclub owner and wins Gloria's heart.  Slip then decides to hypnotize Sach again in order to make him into a wrestler.

Cast

The Bowery Boys
 Leo Gorcey as Terrance 'Slip' Mahoney
 Huntz Hall as Sach Sullivan
 Bobby Jordan as Bobby
 William Benedict as Whitey
 David Gorcey as Chuck

Remaining cast
 Gabriel Dell as Gabe
 Bernard Gorcey as Louie Dumbrowski
 Gale Robbins as Gloria Williams
 Ian Keith as Raymond (the hypnotist)

Production
This is the first film in which Sach is given a last name (Sullivan), however it isn't the familiar name used in latter films of the series (Jones).

Home media
Warner Archives released the film on made-to-order DVD in the United States as part of "The Bowery Boys, Volume Four" on August 26, 2014.

References

External links 
 
 
 
 

1946 films
Bowery Boys films
1940s English-language films
Monogram Pictures films
American boxing films
Films directed by William Beaudine
American black-and-white films
American comedy films
1946 comedy films
1940s American films